Herbert Arthur Martineau (24 December 1914 – 3 May 1994) was a British racewalker. He competed in the men's 50 kilometres walk at the 1948 Summer Olympics.

References

External links
 Herbert Martineau, 1948 Olympian. An appreciation, by Mike Martineau in The Southerner. No. 65, April 2012

1914 births
1994 deaths
Athletes (track and field) at the 1948 Summer Olympics
British male racewalkers
Olympic athletes of Great Britain
Place of birth missing